Jean-Claude Bouchet (born May 2, 1957 in Cavaillon, Vaucluse) is a French politician of the Republicans (LR) who has been serving as a member of the National Assembly of France since the 2007 elections.  He represents the Vaucluse department, and is a member .

Political career
In Parliament, Bouchet serves on the Committee on Foreign Affairs.

Political positions
In the Republicans’ 2016 presidential primaries, Bouchet endorsed Jean-François Copé as the party's candidate for the office of President of France. In the Republicans’ 2017 leadership election, he endorsed Laurent Wauquiez.

In July 2019, Bouchet voted against the French ratification of the European Union’s Comprehensive Economic and Trade Agreement (CETA) with Canada.

References

1957 births
Living people
People from Cavaillon
Union for a Popular Movement politicians
The Republicans (France) politicians
The Popular Right
Knights of the Ordre national du Mérite
Deputies of the 13th National Assembly of the French Fifth Republic
Deputies of the 14th National Assembly of the French Fifth Republic
Deputies of the 15th National Assembly of the French Fifth Republic
Mayors of places in Provence-Alpes-Côte d'Azur